Jeff Waggoner is an American baseball coach and former catcher, who is the former head baseball coach of the Marshall Thundering Herd. He played college baseball at Crowder College from 1995 to 1996 before transferring to Cleveland State from 1997 to 1998.

Playing career
Waggoner played catcher for two years at Crowder College, a junior college in Missouri, before completing his career at Cleveland State.

Coaching career
After completing his playing career, Waggoner began coaching at Saint Rose in Albany, New York.  In his one season with the Golden Knights, they reached the Division II College World Series.  He then landed an assistant coaching position with George Washington.  The Colonials set a school record for wins (42), won the Atlantic 10 Conference championship, and were among the national leaders in many offensive categories in 2002.  Waggoner then moved to Kent State for two seasons.  The Golden Flashes claimed the 2004 Mid-American Conference baseball tournament and saw seven players picked in the Major League Baseball Draft.  He moved to NC State next, where he served as recruiting coordinator, as well as managing player development, academic support and travel, preparing him well for his future head coaching duties.  The Wolfpack appeared in the NCAA Tournament during both seasons, finished second in the 2006 Atlantic Coast Conference baseball tournament, and produced two All-Americans.

In the summer of 2006, Waggoner was named head coach at Marshall of Conference USA.  During his time at Marshall, 24 players have signed professional contracts, and the Thundering Herd set a program record for wins with 30 in 2008.  The 2008 season also saw him named Coach of the Year by Collegiate Baseball Newspaper. On October 13, 2022 Waggoner was fired as head coach at Marshall.

Head coaching record
Below is a table of Waggoner's yearly records as an NCAA head baseball coach.

References

Living people
Crowder Roughriders baseball players
Cleveland State Vikings baseball players
Saint Rose Golden Knights baseball coaches
George Washington Colonials baseball coaches
Kent State Golden Flashes baseball coaches
NC State Wolfpack baseball coaches
Marshall Thundering Herd baseball coaches
Year of birth missing (living people)
Place of birth missing (living people)